Pramodhawardhani (also known as Çrī  Kahulunnan or Çrī  Sanjiwana) was the queen consort of king Rakai Pikatan (r. 838-850) of Mataram Kingdom in 9th century Central Java. She was the daughter of Sailendran king Samaratungga (r. 812—833). 

Her royal marriage to Pikatan, the prince of Sanjaya dynasty, was believed as the political reconciliation between Buddhist Sailendra with Hindu Sanjaya dynasties.

She was credited for the inauguration of Borobudur and the construction of several buddhist temples in Prambanan Plain; among others the small pervara temples in Sewu compound, Plaosan and Sajiwan buddhist temples. Her name was mentioned in several inscriptions, such as Karangtengah inscription, Tri Tepusan inscription and Rukam inscription. Tri Tepusan inscription dated 842 mentioned about the sima (tax-free) lands awarded by Çrī Kahulunnan to ensure the funding and maintenance of a Kamūlān called Bhūmisambhāra (Borobudur), while the Rukam inscription dated 829 Saka (907 CE) mentioned about the inauguration of Rukam village restoration by Nini Haji Rakryan Sanjiwana, previously the village was being devastated by volcanic eruption, and the obligation of Rukam village inhabitants to take care of a sacred building located in Limwung. This sacred building was identified as Sajiwan temple.

According to the interpretation of Loro Jonggrang legend, Pramodhawardhani's likeness was the model for Durga's image in the Prambanan temple.

Notes

Shailendra dynasty
9th-century Indonesian women